Dmitry Pozdnyakov (born 6 July 1972) is a Kazakhstani biathlete. He competed in the men's 20 km individual event at the 1998 Winter Olympics.

References

External links
 

1972 births
Living people
Kazakhstani male biathletes
Olympic biathletes of Kazakhstan
Biathletes at the 1998 Winter Olympics
Sportspeople from Astana
Asian Games medalists in biathlon
Biathletes at the 1999 Asian Winter Games
Biathletes at the 2003 Asian Winter Games
Medalists at the 1999 Asian Winter Games
Asian Games gold medalists for Kazakhstan
Asian Games silver medalists for Kazakhstan
20th-century Kazakhstani people
21st-century Kazakhstani people